The Mitali Express (13131/13132) train is an international express rail service which connects the Indian city of Siliguri with the Bangladeshi capital Dhaka every week. Together with the Maitree Express train and the Bandhan Express train, the Mitali Express train is the third modern-day fully air conditioned passenger train link between the Indian state of West Bengal and Bangladesh. Both the prime ministers of the two neighbouring countries officially inaugurated the non-stop passenger train with ten compartments on the new 513 km route from Dhaka on 26 March 2021, the day Bangladesh celebrated the golden jubilee of its independence. The prime minister of India was in Dhaka to mark the auspicious occasion of fifty years of independence of Bangladesh. After 56 years of stoppage, this train route recreates the previous Siliguri route between India and Bangladesh. A valid visa and passport is required beforehand to purchase a ticket for the Mitali Express train. Tickets are available at Cantonment railway station in Dhaka, Bangladesh and at New Jalpaiguri railway station in Siliguri, India.

Though the train was inaugurated on 26 March 2021, but in the wake of the global COVID-19 pandemic, its commercial run was postponed since its inauguration. However, the train made its first commercial run and resumed normal operations on 1 June 2022.

History
The Prime Minister of India, Narendra Modi, together with the Prime Minister of Bangladesh, Sheikh Hasina, jointly flagged off the New Jalpaiguri to Dhaka Mitali Express train service via video conference from Dhaka on 26 March 2021. Prime Minister Narendra Modi was in Dhaka to celebrate the fifty years of Independence of Bangladesh.

The train service was inaugurated on the occasion of Bangabandhu Sheikh Mujibur Rahman's birth centenary and the golden jubilee (fifty years) of Independence of Bangladesh.

However, the train could not be operated till June 2022 since its inauguration due to COVID-19 pandemic related restrictions. On 1 June 2022, Minister of Railways of India Ashwini Vaishnaw and his Bangladeshi counterpart Md. Nurul Islam Sujon from Delhi flagged off its first commercial run through video conference from Indian Railways Board's Conference Room at New Delhi, India.

Naming 
Railway officials proposed four different names to the Prime Minister of Bangladesh for the name of the new train. These were Mitali, Sampriti, Suhrid and Bondhu. Prime Minister Sheikh Hasina chose the name Mitali. Mitali Express similar to Maitree Express and Bandhan Express is a Bengali name. The Bengali word Mitali means Friendship in English.

Route
The train starts at Dhaka Cantonment railway station on the Bangladesh side, stopping at Parbatipur and Chilahati  and then crosses the border to Haldibari. The distance between Dhaka and Chilahati is 453 km and from Chilahati to New Jalpaiguri is 71 km. Two extra coaches are added at Chilahati for passengers travelling from that area to India. The train then crosses the Indian side, stopping at Haldibari before reaching New Jalpaiguri railway station.

While the proposed halts of the train on the Indian side do not include Jalpaiguri railway station, there are long-standing demands for a stoppage at Jalpaiguri town.

Fares
The fare is expected to be calculated on the basis of US Dollars. Though at the New Jalpaiguri station, the transactions will be made using Indian rupee. The ticket fare for a particular month will be decided on the basis of the exchange rate of Indian rupee with US Dollars on the first day of that month. As the train will solely be operated and maintained by Indian Railways, the rates of ticket fare will also be at their discretion. A 5% GST will be added to basic fare as well. In India, the tickets will be available at the dedicated PRS counter of New Jalpaiguri railway station,Guwahati Railway Station and Kolkata railway station.

Timings and frequency
Since its inauguration, the Bi-weekly train runs on Sundays and Wednesdays from New Jalpaiguri and on Mondays and Thursdays from Dhaka Cantonment. However the stoppages at Haldibari and Chilahati are technical halts only. Passengers boarding or deboarding are not allowed at these two stations.

Timings as of now are: –

Coach composition
Pure LHB coach in red-grey (used by Rajdhani Expresses) and sky blue-grey (used by Shatabdi Expresses) manufactured in India, are used for this train.
The train has 10 coaches. 4 AC Executive Class, 4 AC Chair Car and 2 power car brake vans.

Legends

 Rake composition of 13132 New Jalpaiguri to Dhaka

 while 13131 Dhaka to New Jalpaiguri has reverse rake composition of 13132.

See also
 Bandhan Express
 Maitree Express
 Samjhauta Express
 Transport between India and Bangladesh#Rail links

References

External links
 Bangladesh Railway
 Mitali Express : দীর্ঘ অপেক্ষার অবসান,বাংলাদেশ ছুটে গেলো মিতালি এক্সপ্রেস

Named passenger trains of Bangladesh
Named passenger trains of India
International named passenger trains
Bangladesh–India relations
Rail transport in West Bengal
Transport in Dhaka
Transport in Siliguri